The Directors Guild of America Award for Outstanding Directorial Achievement in Dramatic Series is one of the annual Directors Guild of America Awards given by the Directors Guild of America. It was first presented at the 24th Directors Guild of America Awards in 1972. The current eligibility period is the calendar year.

Winners and nominees

1970s

1980s

1990s

2000s

2010s

2020s

Programs with multiple wins

4 wins
 Hill Street Blues (NBC)

3 wins
 ER (NBC)
 Lou Grant (CBS)

2 wins
 Breaking Bad (AMC)
 Game of Thrones (HBO)
 Homeland (Showtime)
 Kojak (CBS)
 Mad Men (AMC)
 Moonlighting (ABC)
 NYPD Blue (ABC)
 The Sopranos (HBO)
 Succession (HBO)
 thirtysomething (ABC)
 The West Wing (NBC)

Programs with multiple nominations

16 nominations
 The Sopranos (HBO)

11 nominations
 ER (NBC)

10 nominations
 Game of Thrones (HBO)

9 nominations
 Homeland (Showtime)
 Mad Men (AMC)

8 nominations
 Hill Street Blues (NBC)
 NYPD Blue (ABC)
 The West Wing (NBC)

7 nominations
 Succession (HBO)

6 nominations
 Lost (ABC)
 Six Feet Under (HBO)

5 nominations
 Lou Grant (CBS)
 St. Elsewhere (NBC)
 thirtysomething (ABC)

4 nominations
 Breaking Bad (AMC)
 L.A. Law (NBC)
 Northern Exposure (CBS)

3 nominations
 24 (Fox)
 Grey's Anatomy (ABC)
 Homicide: Life on the Street (NBC)
 Kojak (CBS)
 Ozark (Netflix)
 The X-Files (Fox)

2 nominations
 American Crime Story (FX)
 Better Call Saul (Netflix)
 Boardwalk Empire (HBO)
 Cagney & Lacey (CBS)
 Family (ABC)
 The Handmaid's Tale (Hulu)
 House of Cards (Netflix)
 I'll Fly Away (NBC)
 In Treatment (HBO)
 Moonlighting (ABC)
 Severance (Apple TV+)
 The Streets of San Francisco (ABC)
 Stranger Things (Netflix)
 The Waltons (CBS)
 Watchmen (HBO)

Individuals with multiple wins
3 wins
 Lesli Linka Glatter

2 wins
 Robert Butler (consecutive)
 Christopher Chulack (consecutive)
 Marshall Herskovitz (consecutive)
 Eric Laneuville
 Will Mackenzie (consecutive)
 Roger Young (consecutive)

Individuals with multiple nominations

8 nominations
 Paris Barclay
 Lesli Linka Glatter

7 nominations
 Mark Tinker

5 nominations
 Tim Van Patten

4 nominations
 Dan Attias
 Jack Bender
 Christopher Chulack
 Vince Gilligan
 Eric Laneuville
 David Nutter
 Thomas Schlamme

3 nominations
 David Anspaugh
 Alan Ball
 Jason Bateman
 Chris Carter
 Allen Coulter
 Jennifer Getzinger
 Charles Haid
 Marshall Herskovitz
 Mimi Leder
 John Patterson
 Gene Reynolds
 Alan Taylor
 Matthew Weiner

2 nominations
 Félix Enríquez Alcalá
 Corey Allen
 Michael Apted
 Henry J. Bronchtein
 Steve Buscemi
 Robert Butler
 Jon Cassar
 James Cellan Jones
 David Chase
 Michael Cuesta
 Marc Daniels
 Charles S. Dubin
 The Duffer Brothers
 David Friedkin
 Alex Graves
 Joseph Hardy
 Gregory Hoblit
 Peter Horton
 Will Mackenzie
 Miguel Sapochnik
 Roger Young

Total awards by network
 HBO – 13
 NBC – 13
 ABC – 9
 CBS – 7
 AMC – 5
 Showtime – 2
 Fox – 1
 Hulu – 1
 PBS – 1

References

External links
  (official website)

Directors Guild of America Awards